Constituency NA-59 (Attock-III) was a constituency for the National Assembly of Pakistan from 2002 to 2018. In the 2018 delimitations its areas were divided between the new constituencies of NA-55 and NA-56.

Members of Parliament

1977: NA-43 (Campbellpur-III)

1985: NA-43 (Attock-III)

Since 2002: NA-59 (Attock-III)

Election 2002 

General elections were held on 10 Oct 2002. Eman Wasim of PML-Q won by 65,672 votes.

Election 2008 

The result of general election 2008 in this constituency is given below.

Result 
Sardar Salim Haider Khan succeeded in the election 2008 and became the member of National Assembly.

Election 2013 

General elections were held on 11 May 2013. Muhammad Zain Elahi an Independent candidate won  by 60,284 votes and became the  member of National Assembly.

References

External links 
Election result's official website

NA-059
Abolished National Assembly Constituencies of Pakistan